NCMH may refer to:
Manihiki Island Airport in the Cook Islands
National Center for Mental Health in the Philippines

See also
National Collaborating Centre for Mental Health (NCCMH)